Vandivier is a surname. Notable people with the surname include:

Fuzzy Vandivier (1903–1983), American basketball player
Norman Francis Vandivier (1916–1942), American naval aviator
Rick Vandivier (born 1954), American jazz guitarist and composer

See also
Vandiver (disambiguation)
USS Vandivier (DER-540), John C. Butler-class destroyer escort of the United States Navy